The General Aviation XFA was an American biplane fighter aircraft built by the General Aviation Company for the United States Navy.

Development
The PW-4 was built for U.S. Navy Specification No. 96, calling for a carrier-based light fighter. This specification was eventually revealed as a cover for the Navy's actual desire for an airship fighter, the Curtiss XF9C. The XFA was a single-bay biplane with an all-metal fuselage and metal laminate skin. The construction of its fuselage was innovative in that instead of using lap jointing, the edges of each panel were bent inwards, with the rivets fastening them on the inside, instead of being visible on the surface. It had a gull-type upper wing which was fabric covered. The prototype was ordered in 1930, but the company was engaged in another reorganization, which delayed its work. Delivered for evaluations in 1932, it showed poor flying characteristics, including longitudinal instability and over-sensitive controls. General Aircraft increased the area of the tail surfaces and made other changes, then returned the prototype for more testing; but now the stability problems were worse. The plane would nose up with more throttle, but then drop its nose when the throttle was reduced. After another round of modifications, and some close calls, the plane was finally classed as unsafe and testing was abandoned.

Specifications

References

Citations

Bibliography

Lloyd S. Jones, U.S. Naval Fighters (Fallbrook CA: Aero Publishers, 1977), pp. 89–91

Gull-wing aircraft
General Aviation FA
Aircraft first flown in 1932
Sesquiplanes